Bostra lateritialis is a species of snout moth in the genus Bostra. It was described by Achille Guenée in 1854. It is found in South Africa.

References

Endemic moths of South Africa
Pyralini
Moths described in 1854
Moths of Africa